"Don't Turn Around" is a popular song written by Albert Hammond and Diane Warren. It was originally recorded by American singer Tina Turner and released as the B-side to her 1986 hit single "Typical Male". It has since been included on Turner's compilation album The Collected Recordings: Sixties to Nineties (1994), as well as featuring in the Tina musical since 2018.

The song has been covered by numerous artists, most notably by Luther Ingram in 1987, Aswad in 1988, Bonnie Tyler in 1988, Eyes in 1990, Neil Diamond in 1991, Ace of Base in 1993, and Albert Hammond in 2010.

Aswad version

British reggae group Aswad heard Luther Ingram's version and released a cover version on February 10, 1988. It samples a verse from The Righteous Brothers’ 1964 single “You’ve Lost That Lovin’ Feelin’”. The song was released as the first single from their eleventh album, Distant Thunder (1988), and went to number one on the UK Singles Chart in March 1988. It also reached number 45 on the Billboard Hot R&B/Hip-Hop Songs in the US that same year.

Charts

Weekly charts

Year-end charts

Certifications

Ace of Base version

In 1993, Swedish pop group Ace of Base recorded a minor-key version of "Don't Turn Around" for their US debut album, The Sign (1993). It was the follow-up to their successful single, "The Sign", and was also included on the re-release of Happy Nation the same year. Their version reached number one in Canada, number four in the US and number five in the UK. It was the third most popular song in the United States in the summer of 1994.

Background and recording

After the huge success of the band's European debut album, Happy Nation, American label Arista wanted to release it with some new tracks for the US market. They suggested that Ace of Base should make a cover on British reggae group Aswad's 1988 version of "Don't Turn Around". It was recorded and produced at Tuff Studios in Gothenburg, Sweden.

This version by the band would also contain a rap segment made by band member Ulf Ekberg.

Critical reception
AllMusic editor Stephen Thomas Erlewine stated that with singles like "All That She Wants", "The Sign", and "Don't Turn Around", "it's easy to see why they were hits – the beat is relentless and the hooks are incessantly catchy." In an retrospective review, Annie Zaleski from The A.V. Club felt that Ace of Base gave the song "a brisk, breezy vibe that verges on tropical". Larry Flick from Billboard wrote that the Swedish pop phenomenon "will, once again, blaze up the Hot 100 with its slick, lightweight reading of a tune popularized by Aswad." He added that here, "thin but inoffensive vocals are laid over the kind of synth-smart pop/reggae arrangement that top 40 programmers regularly subscribe to." Troy J. Augusto from Cash Box commented, "Can these Swedish hitmakers make it three-for-three? You can bet on it, with the release of the next single from the quartet's smash The Sign, a song made popular in reggae circles by Aswad. Will follow the likes of Big Mountain, etc., up the charts with its easy-listening, synth-flavored mix of reggae and lightweight dance." He also deemed it a "potential summertime smash", adding, "One has to wonder. "What's in the water over at Arista?!"". David Browne from Entertainment Weekly remarked that "the jauntily forlorn" song is "preeminent Europop, all brassy hooks, rushing beats, and exuberant singing that brings to mind Swedish cheerleaders in an ABBA cabaret."

Dave Sholin from the Gavin Report noted that "for their third time at the plate this sensational pop foursome is about take a trip around the bases with what is another surefire home run!" In his weekly UK chart commentary, James Masterton wrote, "Ace of Base's version borrows from the Aswad arrangement but transform it still further from being the simple pop song it was originally into a mournful ballad, dark and mysterious. Whether it is as big as past hits is open to question but it gets my vote for simply daring to reinterpret the track so drastically. Are you listening Big Mountain?" Mario Tarradell from Miami Herald described it as "innocuous". Alan Jones from Music Week gave the song four out of five, noting that here, "the Aswad chart-topper is stripped of much of its melody, and given a heavily percussive workover in order to fit the Ace of Base mould. Fans of their sound will heartily approve, and another Top 10 hit seems inevitable." A reviewer from The Network Forty felt the song is "another bonafide smash", complimenting it as "pure pop". Bob Waliszewski of Plugged In found that "Don't Turn Around" and "The Sign" "demonstrate strength in the wake of romantic rejection." The Rolling Stone Album Guide described it as "a funky Diane Warren song". Chuck Campbell from Scripps Howard News Service called it a "reggae-paced" number.

Chart performance
"Don't Turn Around" was a huge hit around the world and remains one of Ace of Base's more successful songs to date. It reached number one on the RPM Top Singles chart in Canada, and both the US Billboard Adult Contemporary chart and the Cash Box Top 100. In Europe, it made it to the top ten in Austria (8), Denmark (4), Finland (3), Germany (6), Iceland (10), Ireland (8), the Netherlands (7), Scotland (8), and the UK, as well as on the Eurochart Hot 100, where it peaked at number seven in April 1994. In the UK, "Don't Turn Around" reached number five in its third week at the UK Singles Chart, on June 19, 1994. Additionally, it was a top 20 hit in Belgium (13), France (17), Sweden (11), and Switzerland (14). Outside Europe, the single also peaked at number two on the RPM Dance/Urban chart, number three in Israel, number four on the US Billboard Hot 100, number eight in New Zealand and number 19 in Australia. 

"Don't Turn Around" earned a Gold certification in Germany, New Zealand and the United States with a sales of 250,000, 5,000 and 500,000 singles, respectively.

Airplay
"Don't Turn Around" entered the European airplay chart Border Breakers at number 20 on April 2, 1994, due to crossover airplay in Central Europe and peaked at number one twice, first on June 4, followed by July 23. Both times it held on to the top spot for two weeks. Together with "The Sign", "Don't Turn Around" monopolised either the number one or two spot on Border Breakers for 36 weeks.

Impact and legacy
Rolling Stone listed "Don't Turn Around" at number 16 in their "20 Biggest Songs of the Summer: The 1990s" list in July 2014.

Several reviewers have noted that "Don't Turn Around" might have inspired Lady Gaga for her 2010 hit single "Alejandro". Lindsey Fortier from Billboard compared "Alejandro" to "Don't Turn Around" in her review of Gaga's single. In 2014, when "Don't Turn Around" was ranked number 16 by Idolator in their ranking of "The 50 Best Pop Singles of 1994", they wrote: "From its spoken-word intro to its insanely catchy pan flute hook, the song encapsulates everything perfect about pop of that era. I can't be the only one who thinks Lady Gaga was inspired by this immortal classic for her own single, "Alejandro," can I?"

In 2019, Billboard placed it at number 168 in their ranking of "Billboards Top Songs of the '90s".

In 2021, BuzzFeed ranked the song at number 22 in their list of "The 50 Best '90s Songs of Summer".

Music video
Ace of Base filmed a music video for the song, directed by Swedish-based director Matt Broadley, showing scenes of a couple leaving each other intertwined with scenes of the band on the beach and in a beach house. It was shot in Coconut Grove in Miami, Florida, in December 1993. The lighthouse in the video is located in Bill Bags Cape Florida State Park on Key Biscayne, one of Miami's barrier islands. Some parts of the video are in black-and-white, but the scenes with Ace of Base members are in color. The video begins with the group performing inside the beach house. Toward the end, all four members walk along the shore. It received heavy rotation on MTV Europe and was A-listed on Germany's VIVA. Broadley had previously directed the music videos for "All That She Wants" and "Happy Nation". As of December 2022, "Don't Turn Around" had generated more than 33 million views on YouTube.

Track listing

UK CD single
"Don't Turn Around" (The 7" Aswad Mix)
"Don't Turn Around" (Stretch Version)
"Young and Proud"

German 4-track CD
"Don't Turn Around" (Radio Groove Mix)
"Don't Turn Around" (The Aswad Mix)
"Don't Turn Around" (Groove Mix Extended)
"Happy Nation" (Moody Gold Mix)

European 2-CD set
CD 1:
"Don't Turn Around"
"Don't Turn Around" (Stretch Version)
"Young and Proud"

CD 2:
"Don't Turn Around" (The 7" Aswad Mix)
"Don't Turn Around" (Turned Out Eurodub)
"Don't Turn Around" (Groove Mix Extended)
"Happy Nation" (Moody Gold Mix)

Digital download (The Remixes EP, 2009)
"Don't Turn Around"
"Don't Turn Around" (2009)
"Don't Turn Around" (Stretch Version)
"Don't Turn Around" (The 7" Aswad Mix)
"Don't Turn Around" (Turned Out Eurodub)
"Don't Turn Around" (Groove Mix Extended)

Credits and personnel
 Vocals by Linn Berggren, Jenny Berggren, and Ulf Ekberg
 Backing Vocals by Linn Berggren and Jenny Berggren
 Written by Albert Hammond and Diane Warren
 Produced by Tommy Ekman and Per Adebratt
 Recorded and produced at Tuff Studios, Gothenburg
 Mixed at Park Studios, Stockholm

Release history

Charts and certifications

Weekly charts

Year-end charts

Certifications

Other notable cover versions
Soul singer Luther Ingram's version rose to No. 55 on the US Billboard R&B chart in 1987.
In 1992, Neil Diamond recorded a version of "Don't Turn Around", which made the Top 20 on the US Adult Contemporary chart and Top 10 AC in Canada.
In 2010, Albert Hammond, co-writer of the song, recorded the song for his album Legend.

References

External links

1986 songs
1988 singles
1994 singles
Tina Turner songs
Aswad (band) songs
Ace of Base songs
Bonnie Tyler songs
Neil Diamond songs
Songs written by Diane Warren
Songs written by Albert Hammond
Lonnie Gordon songs
Song recordings produced by Bob Clearmountain
Song recordings produced by Denniz Pop
Cashbox number-one singles
RPM Top Singles number-one singles
Music videos directed by Matt Broadley
Mango Records singles
Island Records singles
Arista Records singles
Mega Records singles
Number-one singles in New Zealand
UK Singles Chart number-one singles